Biritch (birich, biryuch ) in Ancient Rus was a herald, an announcer of the will of a knyaz, sometimes kniaz's deputy in police or diplomatic affairs, or tax collector. A birich travelled to settlements, played bugle or horn in the center of a town square or yard to gather people and read the announcement.

The word is thought to be derived from a Turkic word for "bugler", "hornist" (in modern Turkish: borucu, borazancı). Other hypotheses try to base the meanings on interpretations of the root bir-, meaning "to take" in Slavic languages, deriving the meaning "tax collector".

Birich is mentioned in East Slavic manuscripts since the 10th century and until the end of the 17th century. The Laurentian Codex mentions under the year of 992 that knyaz Vladimir of Kiev, when looking for a volunteer to fight a Pecheneg baghatur have sent a birich in regiments. Later tsars of Muscovy announced various ukases via biriches. Heads of the Eastern Orthodox Church also used biriches to announce their decrees. A birich was supposed to make an announcement in market place, not once but many times, sometimes during several months. Later other administrators (namestniks, voyevodas, etc.) had biriches in their staff, as mentioned in payrolls.

The word "biritch" is the name of a 19th-century card game. It is said to have originated in Russia, but satisfactory evidence of this has not been discovered. It is considered to be a precursor of contract bridge.

See also
Russian whist
Eralash (card game)

References

Medieval occupations
Society of Kievan Rus'
19th-century card games